Magnus Carlsson is the second studio album by Magnus Carlsson. The album was released in April 2006 and peaked at number 3 on the Swedish charts.

Track listing
Som om inget hänt
Discodåre
Då talar kärleken sitt språk
Mellan vitt och svart
I mina händer
Det största av allt
Lev livet!
Som din himmel ger mitt hav
Mitt hjärta, ta mitt hjärta
Funnit min ängel
Det måste va med dig
Jag ser dig, jag ser dig, jag ser dig

Contributors
Magnus Carlsson - singer
Ola Gustavsson - guitar
Christer Jansson - drums, percussion
Anders Glenmark - keyboard, bass, guitar, producer
Stockholm Session Strings - musicians

Charts

Release history

References

2006 albums
Magnus Carlsson albums
Sony BMG albums